Apan is a municipality of the state of Hidalgo, Mexico.

Apan or APAN may also refer to:
 The Ape (2009 film), Swedish film (original title Apan)
 159215 Apan, an asteroid
 APAN Star Awards, an awards ceremony for excellence in television in South Korea
 Asia Pacific Adaptation Network, climate research organisation based in Thailand
 Asia Pacific Advanced Network, association of Asia-Pacific NRENs
 All Partners Access Network (formerly Asia Pacific Area Network), United States government website used for information sharing for humanitarian aid, disaster management, and security control